Cyanthillium is a genus of tropical plants in the ironweed tribe within the sunflower family.

Species
Cyanthillium albicans (DC.) H.Rob. - southwestern India
Cyanthillium cinereum (L.) H.Rob. - tropical Asia + tropical Africa; naturalized in tropical Americas including Florida
Cyanthillium conyzoides (DC.) H.Rob. - southwestern India
Cyanthillium hookerianum (Arn.) H.Rob. - Sri Lanka
Cyanthillium patulum (Dryand. ex Dryand.) H.Rob. - tropical Asia, Madagascar
Cyanthillium stelluliferum (Benth.) H.Rob. - tropical Africa
Cyanthillium vernonioides (Muschl.) H.Rob. - central Africa
Cyanthillium wollastonii (S.Moore) H.Rob. - East Africa

References

External links
	

 
Asteraceae genera